The ABU TV Song Festival 2019 was the eighth annual edition of the ABU TV Song Festivals.

History
The event, which is non-competitive, took place in Tokyo, coinciding with the 56th General Assembly of the Asia-Pacific Broadcasting Union (ABU).

List of participants
A total of eleven countries took part in the ABU TV Song Festival 2019. Australia returned to the event after five year absence. Apart from the participating songs, the show also included special performances from Joe Hisaishi and Foorin.

See also 
 ABU TV Song Festival
 ABU Radio Song Festival
 Asia-Pacific Broadcasting Union

References

ABU Song Festivals
2019 song contests